John Dennis 'Jiggy' Harris (4 November 1903 – 29 June 1993) was an Australian rules footballer who played with Collingwood and Hawthorn in the VFL.

Family
The son of Charles Ernest Harris (1873–1943), and Florence Harris (1876–1954), née Harris, John Dennis Harris was born at Mildura, Victoria on 4 November 1903.

His brother, Stanley William Harris (1909–1964), was a VFL footballer with Richmond and Footscray.

Football
Recruited from Brighton, Harris started his career at Collingwood where he played as both a wingman and half forward flanker. He was a member of Collingwood premiership sides in 1927 and 1928. After being dropped for the 1929 Grand Final, thus missing out on a third successive premiership, Harris left Collingwood and joined Hawthorn as captain-coach. He spent two seasons with Hawthorn before joining VFA club Coburg where he played in a losing grand final in 1933.

References

External links

1903 births
1993 deaths
Hawthorn Football Club coaches
Hawthorn Football Club players
Collingwood Football Club players
Collingwood Football Club Premiership players
Coburg Football Club players
Brighton Football Club players
Australian rules footballers from Victoria (Australia)
Two-time VFL/AFL Premiership players
People from Mildura